Major facilitator superfamily domain containing 8 also called MFSD8 is a protein that in humans is encoded by the MFSD8 gene. MFSD8 is an atypical SLC, thus a predicted SLC transporter. It clusters phylogenetically to the Atypical MFS Transporter family 2 (AMTF2).

Function
MFSD8 is a ubiquitous integral membrane protein which contains a transporter domain and a major facilitator superfamily (MFS) domain. Other members of the major facilitator superfamily transport small solutes through chemiosmotic ion gradients. The substrate transported by this protein is unknown. The protein, likely localizes to lysosomal membranes.

Clinical significance
Mutations in the MFSD8 gene have been of neuronal ceroid lipofuscinosis.

References

External links
 GeneReviews/NIH/NCBI/UW entry on Neuronal Ceroid-Lipofuscinoses

Further reading